Bulri Shah Karim (Sindhi:بلڙي شاھ ڪريم)  is a town and taluka headquarter of Tando Muhammad Khan District, Sindh, Pakistan. after the name of Shah Abdul Karim Bulri. It has status of town committee as well.

References 

Towns in Pakistan